Azar is the common English spelling for several given names and surnames: the Arabic  , the Persian   (sometimes also romanised as ), as well as a Hebrew name עזר. Azar is a common boys', girls', and last name in Persian-speaking countries. Azar means fire in Persian. Azarkadeh or Atashkadeh (Atash is another name for fire in Persian) are the places of worship for Zoroastrians. Zoroastrianism is a religion and a belief that originated in Iran. 

People with the name include:

Religious figures
Āzar (Arabic: ءازَرُ), or Terah, father of Abraham in the Islamic tradition
Azar, derivative of Elazar, Lazarus of Bethany, whom Jesus raised from the dead.

Given name
Azar Bigdeli (1722–1781), Iranian anthologist and poet
Azar Gat (born 1959), Israeli researcher and author on military history
Azar Karadas (born 1981), Norwegian football player of Turkish descent
Āzar Kayvān, (16–17c.), Zoroastrian high priest of Iran who emigrated to India and founded an illuminationists school
Azar Lawrence (born 1952), American jazz saxophonist
Azar Majedi, Iranian communist activist, writer
Azar Nafisi (born 1955), Iranian academic

Surname
Tony (Antoine) Azar, Lebanese-American Business executive.
Alex Azar (born 1967), American lawyer, Secretary of the U.S. Department of Health and Human Services and former Eli Lilly executive
Amado Azar (1913–1971), Argentine boxer and Olympian
Assi Azar (born 1979), Israeli television personality
Betty Azar, teacher and the author of several English grammar workbooks that are a staple in the English as a second language teaching industry
Brett Azar, American actor. Body double proxy of Arnold Schwarzenegger. 
Carla Azar, American drummer
Caroline Azar, Canadian director, actor, and playwright. Lead singer, keyboardist and co-lyricist/composer of the band Fifth Column
Dina Azar, Miss Lebanon 1995, television personality and host, fashion designer
Edward Azar (1938–1991), Lebanese professor of government and politics
Emilè Azar (born 1985), Swedish singer of Lebanese origin
George Azar (born 1959), Lebanese American photojournalist and documentary film maker
Habib Azar (born 1979), American film, theater and television director
Ignatius Isaac Azar, Syriac Orthodox Patriarch of Antioch during 1709–1722
Jacobo Majluta Azar (1934-1996), Dominican politician of Lebanese origin. President of the Dominican Republic, Vice president and senator  
Joseph Azar (prince), Jewish prince of the Anjuvannam in Cochin, South India
Joseph Azar (singer) (born 1942), Lebanese artist and singer
Mehdi Azar (1901–1994), Iranian physician and politician
Mehdi Azar Yazdi (1921–2009), Iranian writer
Naser Cheshmazar, sometimes spelled Naser Cheshm Azar, (1950–2018), Iranian musician, composer and arranger
Pablo Azar (born 1982), Mexican actor
Raymond Azar (born 1953), head of Lebanese military intelligence
Rick Azar, American broadcaster 
Roberto Azar (born 1966), Argentine tennis player
Rony Azar (born 1983), Lebanese football (soccer) player
Steve Azar (born 1964), American country music artist

See also
Azar v. Garza
United States House of Representatives v. Azar
Azar (disambiguation)

Persian given names
Hebrew-language names
Arabic-language names
Persian unisex given names